Vórtex Demo is the first demo tape released by Brazilian rock band Os Cascavelletes in 1987. It would attain them a massive reputation in the underground Rio Grande do Sul rock scene, and highly sexually explicit tracks such as "Estupro com Carinho", "Banana Split", "A Última Virgem" and "Morte por Tesão" became staples of their self-proclaimed style, "porno rock".

Even though the tape doesn't have an official name printed on its cover, it is commonly referred to as "Vórtex Demo" after the studio in which it was recorded, the Estúdio Vórtex, which was owned by the members of yet another influential rock band from Rio Grande do Sul, Os Replicantes.

"Pombo Surfista" is a Portuguese-language version of The Trashmen's "Surfin' Bird". "Entra Nessa" was originally written by vocalist Flávio Basso for his former project TNT. A handful of tracks from the demo would be re-recorded for the band's subsequent releases, the 1988 EP Os Cascavelletes and the 1989 full-length Rock'a'ula.

The tape closes with five bonus live tracks, recorded at one of the band's first gigs ever at Santa Cruz do Sul.

Covers
Crossover/hardcore punk band Ratos de Porão covered "O Dotadão Deve Morrer" for the Brazilian release of their 1995 cover album Feijoada Acidente?.

Track listing

Personnel
 Flávio Basso – vocals, electric guitar
 Nei Van Soria – vocals, electric guitar
 Frank Jorge – bass guitar
 Alexandre Barea – drums

References

Demo albums
1987 albums
Os Cascavelletes albums
Self-released albums
Obscenity controversies in music